The Marquette University fraternity and sorority system offers organizations under the Interfraternity Council (IFC), the National Pan-Hellenic Council (NPHC) and the Panhellenic Council (NPC). About 10% of the total undergraduate student body is active in Greek life.

IFC fraternities
There are eight fraternities at Marquette affiliated with the Interfraternity Council (IFC).
 Delta Chi
 Delta Sigma Pi, a coeducational fraternity with a focus on business education
 Delta Tau Delta
 Kappa Sigma 
 Sigma Chi
 Sigma Lambda Beta, a primarily Latin-American social fraternity
 Sigma Phi Delta, an engineering fraternity
 Sigma Phi Epsilon
 Triangle Fraternity, an engineering, science and architecture fraternity

NPHC fraternities and sororities
All member fraternities and sororities of the National Pan-Hellenic Council (NPHC), including those at Marquette University, are historically made up primarily of African-American students. Those with chapters at Marquette include:

Fraternities:
 Alpha Phi Alpha
 Iota Phi Theta
 Kappa Alpha Psi
 Omega Psi Phi
 Phi Beta Sigma

Sororities:
 Delta Sigma Theta
 Alpha Kappa Alpha
 Sigma Gamma Rho
 Zeta Phi Beta

NPC sororities
Nine of Marquette's Greek organizations are members of the Panhellenic Association (NPC). One of them, Alpha Omega Epsilon, an engineering sorority, was founded at Marquette.
 Alpha Chi Omega
 Alpha Omega Epsilon, a sorority for women in Engineering and Technical Science
 Alpha Phi
 Alpha Xi Delta
 Delta Xi Phi, a sorority dedicated to multicultural awareness
 Kappa Delta
 Pi Beta Phi
 Sigma Kappa
 Sigma Lambda Gamma, a historically Latina-based sorority.

Greek organizations formerly at Marquette
There are several fraternities and sororities that once had chapters at Marquette. They include:
 Kappa Beta Gamma, the first sorority at Marquette. It still exists as an international sorority.
 Sigma Sigma Sigma
 Gamma Phi Beta
 Alpha Epsilon Pi
 Alpha Kappa Psi
 Alpha Delta Gamma
 Phi Delta Theta
 Tau Kappa Epsilon
 Gamma Theta Pi
 Alpha Gamma Phi
 Phi Kappa Theta

References

Marquette University
Marquette University
Wisconsin education-related lists